The 1938 NAIA basketball tournament was held in March at Municipal Auditorium in Kansas City, Missouri. The second annual NAIA basketball tournament featured 32 teams playing in a single-elimination format. 

This was the first tournament to expand to 32 teams. The tournament featured the only forfeit in tournament history when Western Kentucky forfeited to Simpson due to not showing up. The first-round game between Delta State University (Miss.)  and Drury gave the first overtime in tournament history. Delta State beat Drury College 52–51 in one overtime. 

The championship game featured Central Missouri State defending their first national championship over Roanoke, making them the first team to win back-to-back titles. It would be the last year without a Chuck Taylor Most Valuable Player Award.

Awards and honors
Many of the records set by the 1938 tournament have been broken, and many of the awards were established much later:
Leading scorer est. 1963
Leading rebounder est. 1963
Chuck Taylor Most Valuable Player est. 1939
Charles Stevenson Hustle Award est. 1958
Coach of the Year est. 1954
Player of the Year est. 1994

Bracket

  * denotes overtime.
  † denotes forfeit.

See also
 1938 National Invitation Tournament

References

NAIA Men's Basketball Championship
Tournament
1938 in sports in Missouri